Castle Hill (originally known as Elvill's) is a large late-18th-century or early-19th-century Grade II listed mansion in Englefield Green, Surrey. The estate totaled 33 acres in 2012, it had previously stood at 108 acres at the time of its 1863 sale. It was designed by Stiff Leadbetter for Sir John Elwill, 4th Baronet and built between 1758 and 1763. The estate was bought by the banker George C. Raphael in the late 19th century.

It was purchased by the Ugland Marine Insurance Company in the 1990s. It is presently owned by a foreign royal family. 

In addition to the main house, the entrance gates, bothy, stable block, and dairy are all individually Grade II listed.

References

Buildings by Stiff Leadbetter
Country houses in Surrey
Gothic Revival architecture in Surrey
Grade II listed buildings in Surrey
Grade II listed houses
Houses completed in 1763
Borough of Runnymede